This is the first edition of the event.

Márton Fucsovics won the title, defeating Dustin Brown in the final, 6–3, 6–4.

Seeds

Draw

Finals

Top half

Bottom half

References
 Main Draw
 Qualifying Draw

Internazionali di Tennis Castel del Monte - Singles
2013 Singles
2013 in Italian tennis